Seth David La Fera (born 28 September 1975) is an Italian baseball player who competed in the 2000 Summer Olympics and in the 2004 Summer Olympics.

References

1975 births
Living people
Olympic baseball players of Italy
Baseball players at the 2000 Summer Olympics
Baseball players at the 2004 Summer Olympics
Parma Baseball Club players
Rimini Baseball Club players
T & A San Marino players
Italian expatriate sportspeople in San Marino